Al-Ṣaḥafi al-Taih (الصحفي التائه The Wandering Journalist) was a Lebanese satirical newspaper.

The paper was founded around 1922 by two Lebanese Christians, Iskandar Riyadh and Yusuf Ibrahim Yazbeck.

References

Newspapers established in 1922
Mass media in Lebanon
Satirical newspapers
Arabic-language newspapers